The 2021–22 Megyei Bajnokság I includes the championships of 20 counties in Hungary. It is the fourth tier of the Hungarian football league system.

Bács-Kiskun

League table
<onlyinclude>

Baranya

League table
<onlyinclude>

Békés

League table
<onlyinclude>

Borsod-Abaúj-Zemplén

League table
<onlyinclude>

Budapest

League table
<onlyinclude>

Csongrád-Csanád

League table
<onlyinclude>

Fejér

League table
<onlyinclude>

Győr-Moson-Sopron

League table
<onlyinclude>

Hajdú-Bihar

League table
<onlyinclude>

Heves

League table
<onlyinclude>

Jász-Nagykun-Szolnok

League table
<onlyinclude>

Komárom-Esztergom

League table
<onlyinclude>

Nógrád

League table
<onlyinclude>

Pest

League table
<onlyinclude>

Somogy

League table
<onlyinclude>

Szabolcs-Szatmár-Bereg

League table
<onlyinclude>

Tolna

League table
<onlyinclude>

Vas

League table
<onlyinclude>

Veszprém

League table
<onlyinclude>

Zala

League table
<onlyinclude>

See also
 2021–22 Nemzeti Bajnokság I
 2021–22 Nemzeti Bajnokság II
 2021–22 Nemzeti Bajnokság III
 2021–22 Magyar Kupa

References

External links
  

1
Hungary
Megyei Bajnokság I